A Baklava bond is a bond denominated in Turkish lira and issued by a domestic or foreign entity in Turkey. The name refers to baklava, a Turkish dessert.

In October 2010, Turkish authorities allowed companies to issue bonds.

References

Bonds in foreign currencies
Finance in Turkey